Samidh Mukherjee (also spelled Mukherjee) is an Indian singer, songwriter and music composer from Kolkata, India. Mukherjee mainly works on Bengali and Hindi language films and television shows,. He also part of the Bengali music director's duo Samidh-Rishi.

Career 
Later in his career Mukerjee composed many popular songs for many Bengali films. Some of his successful projects as a music composer are Macho Mustanaa, Loveria, Kranti, Josh, Dui Prithibi, Shedin Dekha Hoyechilo, 100% Love, Om Shanti, Majnu, Faande Poriya Boga Kaande Re etc.

His debut music album Amar Blue Sunglass was released in 2012 from Remac Muzik. Amar Blue Sunglass has seven different genres of songs written, composed and sung by Mukerjee himself.

Singers from Hindi film and music industry like, Shreya Ghoshal, Sunidhi Chauhan, Kunal Ganjawala and many more sang under Mukerjee's music direction in the film Macho Mustanaa. Shreya Ghoshal sang the song "Jaane Jaana" from the film Macho Mustanaa in Mukerjee's composition. Usha Uthup also sang in Mukerjee's composition. Kalpana Patowary was nominated as Best Female Playback Singer in 12th Tele-Cine Award, Kolkata for Mukerjee's composition "Koka Kola" from Bengali film Faande Poriya Boga Kaande Re.

Mukerjee appeared as an actor in Bengali film Loveria, which was released in 2013.

Mukerjee was featured in a song with Rakhi Sawant in the Bengali film Om Shanti. The song was composed and sung by Mukerjee himself.

Apart from acting, Mukerjee participated in the Bangla version (regional version) of the dancing reality show (dancing competition) Jhalak Dikhhla Jaa, which was aired in ETV Bangla. Mukerjee was one of the finalists of the show.

Mukerjee was last seen in television as a contestant of Zee Bangla's Dance Bangla Dance Season 8. He was among the finalists of the show.

Mukerjee recently composed two songs for Pallavi Chatterjee's album Folk Sutra.

Awards 
Samidh-Rishi composer duo got Fever 104 FM Best Music Director Award for the film Shedin Dekha Hoyechilo.
Mukerjee was nominated for Best Music Director Award for the film Loveria (Tele Cine Awards 2013).

Filmography

Music album

Television

References

External links 
 Official Website

Indian male singer-songwriters
Indian singer-songwriters
Musicians from Kolkata
Living people
Year of birth missing (living people)